Supraśl is a town and former episcopal see in north-eastern Poland.

It is the seat of the Gmina of Supraśl. Its population is 4,526 (2004).

History 

The settlement was founded in the 16th century. After the Third Partition of Poland in 1795, it was annexed by Prussia. In 1807 it passed to the Russian Partition of Poland. In 1823, a 10th-century manuscript, the oldest Slavic literary work in Poland, named the Codex of Supraśl was discovered in the Supraśl Monastery by Michał Bobrowski.

After 1831, the textile industry developed. In 1834 manufacturer Wilhelm Fryderyk Zachert came from Zgierz to Supraśl and significantly contributed to the development of the village into a town. Until the mid-19th century, it was the largest center of the textile industry in the region, before it was surpassed by nearby Białystok. In the 19th century, mostly Catholics lived there, but also Protestants, Orthodox and Jews. During World War I from 1915 to 1919 it was occupied by the Germans. After 1919, in independent Poland. During World War II it was occupied by the Soviets from 1939 to 1941 and by the Germans from 1941 to 1944. The Soviets destroyed part of the monastery's interior, and the Germans destroyed most of the industrial plants.

In 2001 Supraśl was recognized as a spa town.

Ecclesiastical History 
 On 6 March 1798 was established the Ruthenian Catholic Eparchy (Eastern Catholic Diocese) of Supraśl / Supraslien(sis) Ruthenorum (Latin adjective), on presently Polish territory not previously served by that particular church sui iuris (Byzantine Rite in Ruthenian language). Pope Pius VI's papal bulla Susceptam a Nobis di papa, thus canonically executed its erection, which was devised by the Prussian kingdom (Fredrick William II) in January 1797 for the parts of the Eparchy of Brėst and Archeparchy of Kiev that became Prussian in the Third partition of Poland. The Pope made it exempt, i.e. directly subject to the Holy See, not part of any ecclesiastical province, and installed a cathedral chapter comprising a provost and four canons.
 It was suppressed on 1809.02.14, without Catholic successor, by imperial edict of the Czar Alexander I of Russia, annexing it to the Eparchy of Brest, after the Convention of Bartenstein (April 1807) and Peace of Tilsit (July 1807) transferred its territory from Prussia to the Russian empire.

It has had only three incumbents :
Exempt Eparch (Bishops) of Supraśl of the Ruthenians
 Theodosius Wislocki, Basilian Order of Saint Josaphat (O.S.B.M.) (1797 – death 1801.05.18)
 Nicholas Duchnowski (1803.05.16 – death 1805.06.25) Bishop-elect Father Leo Jaworowski (1807 – 1809 not possessed lacking confirmation by Rome), next Auxiliary bishop of Eparch Jozafat Bułhak in Brest and titular bishop of Volodymyr.

Supraśl is also a titular bishopric of the Polish Orthodox Church.

Culture and heritage 
It is the home of the Supraśl Lavra, founded by Aleksander Chodkiewicz, one of six Eastern Orthodox monasteries for men in Poland. The Codex of Supraśl, the oldest Slavic literary work in Poland and one of the oldest of its kind in the world, is named after the Supraśl Lavra. Since September 2007 it has been on UNESCO's Memory of the World list. The Museum of Icons is located in the Chodkiewicz Palace within the monastery complex.

Other historic landmarks include the Buchholtz Palace, which now houses the Art High School, the Catholic churches of Our Lady Queen of Poland and of the Holy Trinity, the town hall, cinema, a 19th-century park and historic wooden architecture.

International relations

Twin towns — Sister cities
Supraśl is twinned with:

  Zgierz, Poland

See also 
 List of Catholic dioceses in Poland

References

Sources and external links 
 Official town webpage
 GCatholic 
 Bibliography - ecclesiastical history
 Augustin Theiner, Die neuesten Zustände der Katholischen Kirche beider Ritus in Polen und Rußland seit Katharina II. bis auf unsere Tage, Augsburg 1841
 Konrad Eubel, Hierarchia Catholica Medii Aevi, vol. 6, p. 389
 Alfred Ignatowicz, Greckokatolicka diecezja supraska (1796-1807), in "Wiadomości Kościele Archidiecezji w białymstoku" 1976, r. 2, nr 4, pp. 105–116.
 Radosław Dobrowolski, Opat Supraski Biskup Leon Ludwik Jaworowski, Supraśl 2003, p. 333.
 Nikolaj Dalmatov, Supraslskij Blagowescanskij Monastyr, St. Peterburg 1892, p. 611.
 Gaetano Moroni, Dizionario di erudizione storico-ecclesiastica, vol. 71, Venice 1855, pp. 76–78
 Leonard Drożdżewicz, Overheard in Suprasl Academy, „Znad Wilii”,  Viešoji įstaiga „Znad Wilii” kultūros plėtros draugija, ISSN 1392-9712 indeks 327956, nr 1 (81) z 2020 r., pp. 91–97, (in Polish)http://www.znadwiliiwilno.lt/wp-content/uploads/2020/04/Znad-Wilii-1-81m-1-1.pdf

Cities and towns in Podlaskie Voivodeship
Białystok County
Belostoksky Uyezd
Białystok Voivodeship (1919–1939)
Belastok Region